Mezraa, Doğanyol is a village of Malatya Province in eastern Turkey, located on the Euphrates river at 38° 21' 29" N	39° 6' 57" E. The name derives from the Turkish word Mezra meaning 'Hamlet'.

History
Human settlement has happened in the area for about 10,000 years. 

In the late 10th century the area came under control of the Byzantine Empire.

In the 11th century, the town was ruled by Islamic dynasties such as the Ahlatshahs, then in the 16th the Ottomans took control over the area.

On 24 January 2020, the town was impacted by a magnitude 6.7 earthquake.

See also 
 Mezraa, Vezirköprü
 Mezra, Akçadağ
 Başmezra, Pötürge
 Sivrice
 Doğanyol

References 

Populated places in Malatya Province